Chloroclystis torninubis is a moth in the family Geometridae.It was described by Prout in 1929. It is found on the Marquesas Archipelago.

References

External links

Moths described in 1929
torninubis